The 9th Sabor was inaugurated on 14 October 2016. The assembly came into existence following the early parliamentary election on 11 September 2016 and consists of 151 representatives elected from 10 geographical and two special electoral districts.

On 18 May 2020, the 9th Sabor dissolved itself by a vote of 105 in favor.

Parliamentary officials

The Speaker of the Croatian Parliament (or President) from 5 May 2017 is Gordan Jandroković who served before that as one of the vice presidents. From 14 October 2016 until his resignation on 5 May 2017 Božo Petrov, the president of the Bridge of Independent Lists (MOST) was the Speaker.

Vice presidents of Sabor are from government side Milijan Brkić and former Speaker Željko Reiner (all HDZ), from opposition side Milanka Opačić (SDP). Besides Jandroković, Ivan Vrdoljak (HNS) served also as vice president until 9 June 2017. The Italian national minority MP Furio Radin took over his position on 19 June 2017.

Composition
On the basis of the early parliamentary election of 2016, the composition of the Sabor  is as follows. There has to be noted that national minority MPs can join other clubs as well beside the national minority group.

By parliamentary bloc

By political party

MPs by party

References

Lists of representatives in the modern Croatian Parliament by term
2010s in Croatia